Ramsrigelj is a remote abandoned former settlement in the Municipality of Kočevje in southern Slovenia. The area is part of the traditional region of Lower Carniola and is now included in the Southeast Slovenia Statistical Region. Its territory is now part of the village of Knežja Lipa.

History
Ramsrigelj was a village inhabited by Gottschee Germans. Before the Second World War it had five houses. In May 1942 the settlement was burned by Italian troops. It was not rebuilt after the war, and the pastures were incorporated into a collective farm.

References

External links
Ramsrigelj on Geopedia
Pre–World War II map of Ramsrigelj with oeconyms and family names

Former populated places in the Municipality of Kočevje